Praecitrullus fistulosus, commonly known as Tinda, also called Indian squash, round melon, Indian round gourd or apple gourd or Indian baby pumpkin, is a squash-like cucurbit grown for its immature fruit, a vegetable especially popular in South Asia. It is the only member of the genus Praecitrullus.

The plant is as with all cucurbits, a prolific vine, and is grown as an annual. The plant also is prickly with small thorns similar to the zucchini. The fruit is approximately spherical, and 5–8 cm in diameter The seeds may also be roasted and eaten. Tinda is a famous nickname among Punjabi families in both India and Pakistan. This unique squash-like gourd is native to India, very popular in Indian and Pakistani cooking with curry and many gourmet dishes. Green colored, apple-sized fruits are flattish round in shape and 50–60 grams in weight. Plants are vigorous, productive and begin to bear fruits in 70 days after planting.

Tinda is also called "ऐभी" and "हस्तिघोषालताफलम्" in Sanskrit . It's called "tindsi" in Rajasthan. In Marathi, it is called dhemase ढेमसे. in Hindi and Marathi also called "dilpasand" In Sindhi language, it is called meha.

Tinda can be confused with tendli or kundru due to similar-sounding names from different languages and regions. Tinda in Punjabi, Hindi and most North Indian languages is "Indian baby pumpkin".

Global production of the tinda fruit was estimated to be about 1.3 million metric tons in 2013.  India is the largest producer of tinda, followed by Pakistan and Bangladesh. Other major producing countries include China, Nepal, and Sri Lanka.

References

External links 

Cucurbitoideae
Flora of the Indian subcontinent
Fruit vegetables